"I'm Just a Girl" is a song by Australian pop music duo Bachelor Girl. The song was released on 1 July 2002 as the lead single from the group's second studio album, Dysfunctional (2002). The song peaked at number 25 on the Australian ARIA Singles Chart.

Music video
The music video was shot on location at the Ansett Australia Melbourne Airport Terminal, in Melbourne, Australia not long after the airline had ceased operations in 2002. An Ansett aircraft as well as the deserted gate lounges, arrivals hall and Golden Wing Club Lounge served as the backdrop for the video. Twenty former Ansett staff participated as extras in the shoot, which took two days to film.

Track listing
Australian CD single
 "I'm Just a Girl" – 3:54
 "I'm Just a Girl" (Matrixectomy mix) – 3:27
 "I'm Just a Girl" (JR's Groovedog mix) – 12:43
 "Falling" – 4:26
 "I'm Just a Girl" (video)

Charts

Release history

References

2002 singles
2002 songs
Bachelor Girl songs